You're So Cool is a manhwa written by the author Lee Young-hee. Six volumes and a bonus artwork have been released as of June 2006 about Nan Woo and Seung Ha's love story.

Plot summary
Nan Woo is a clueless, naive and easy going girl. She has an easy life and no noteworthy problems. Her family is conformed by her mother (who is actually the father figure) and her uncle (the mother figure). Her friends tease her because she is unintelligent and clumsy which others find amusing. Nan Woo has always been in love with Ryu Seung Ha, the president of her class and prince of the school. He is a top student, athletic, charismatic, nice and attractive.

One day while doing her class duties, Nan Woo overhears the school's princess confessing her love to Seung Ha and to her surprise (and everybody's else) she is rejected in the most rude, unkind, cold and even a little aggressive way. Nan Woo can't believe her Prince Charming has this other, cruel side and tries to run – but naturally she bumps into a tree. Seung Ha, who was walking back to class, saw everything and helps her get up. He asks her if she heard what just happened. She admits she did, apologizes and tells him she actually would always love him no matter what he was like. Seung Ha is surprised but can't reply to her because a teacher calls him.

The next day Chan Gyu (a boy in their class that is always fighting with Nan Woo), tells his friends he is going to confess his feelings to Nan Woo after classes end. Seung Ha overhears him, he follows Chan Gyu to the bathroom and after a rather impolite threat, he locks Chan Gyu in the bathroom and leaves to look for Nan Woo.
Once they meet, Seung Ha confesses he also has feelings for her and asks her to be his girlfriend. Nan Woo is so happy she thinks it's all a crazy dream. But the next morning, Seung Ha tells the entire class, who seemed shocked and angry, that he is dating Nan Woo.

Shortly after, Seung Ha tells Nan Woo that they will have a date next day. Full of excitement, she gets to the place where they are supposed to meet, but instead of the always neat, kind and charming Seung Ha, she finds an untamed, enigmatic, and extreme gangster. Nan Woo's life will never be the same.
As the story unfolds, Nan Woo learns more about Seung Ha's life, and why he has such different personae. She realizes that using "masks" to hide his real self, is Seung Ha's way of coping with the pain he suffered when his mother left him as a kid. It's up to her, the funny, clumsy girl, to show him that she will truly stay by his side no matter what, and help him break out of his past.

The series also contains a Boys Love (Yaoi) story between Jae, Nan Woo's uncle, and Hyun-Ho, an acquaintance of Seung Ha.

Characters
Jung Nan Woo – She is somewhat of a tom-boy, with a small frame and short hair. She is very clumsy, and always falls on her face or bump into things. She is not very smart; she eats and sleeps during class, one time waking up and shouting "The Japanese are coming!" to the laughter of the class. Nan Woo is very simple but happy. When she finds out that Seung Ha is not the perfect prince she thought he was, at first she tries to avoid him, but being a klutz, she fails. Quickly she sees that there is more to know about him, and decides that she want to know. She goes a great length to show him that she will not abandon him.

Ryu Seung Ha – At school, he is smart, rich, handsome, and caring. After school, he's a rude punk and a gangster. He is the son of a wealthy man and his beautiful mistress. When he was ten years old, his mother left without a word. His father brought him in to his house where his wife and legitimate son live. Seung Ha had to deal with the pain of betrayal he felt by his mother leaving him, as well as the new hostile surroundings. As a result, he decided to never expose his real self and emotions, and creates a new image when he sees the need for it. He was attracted by the way Nan Woo was carrying herself, with brutal truth and no disguises – his exact opposite. He torments her for a while, but in fact he wants her to see past his masks and help him.

Jae – He is Nan Woo's uncle and her mom's half-brother. He moved with Nan Woo and her mother when he was a high school student after his father died. Like Seung Ha, being left alone by his parents (though for different reasons) left a mental scar. Therefore, he is scared of being alone. He is as beautiful as a woman, and has no problem finding girlfriends. But they leave when they realize it doesn't matter to him who he is with, as long as he is not alone. He sees Hyun Ho only as a friend as he is not interested in men, but eventually agrees to a relationship when Hyun Ho explains how much he needs him.

Hyun Ho – Living by himself in a run-down one-room apartment and working temporary jobs, he meets Jae while reading a book in the park. Jay invites him over after he helps him with groceries, and Hyun Ho is confused by Jay's naivete and friendliness. Over time, his feelings for Jay grow into love and he pursues him, though not very elegantly, by pestering him at his house. Eventually it works, however. Hyun Ho knows Seung Ha as he once helped him after a fight. Seung Ha found refuge in Hyun Ho's little apartment and even left the only picture he had of his mom there.

Jae Young – Nan Woo's mom. She is drawn to look manly with no chest and wide shoulders. She is somewhat of a comic character that often gets into violent arguments with Nan Woo, or is seen drunk with her rock band. She does have a serious side, though. She works as a nurse, and is a good judge of human character. She immediately spots Seung Ha's broken self when she meets him.

Humor comics
Romance comics
Manhwa titles
2002 comics debuts
Yen Press titles